Calculate Linux is a Linux distribution optimized for fast deployment in an organization environment. It is based on the Gentoo Linux project and includes many preconfigured functions.

Calculate Linux is distributed in five flavours: Calculate Linux Desktop (CLD), Calculate Directory Server (CDS), Calculate Linux Scratch (CLS), Calculate Scratch Server (CSS), and Calculate Linux Container (CLC).

Bootable live CDs are available for all versions. They can be used to install Calculate Linux on a hard disk drive or USB flash drive.

Features 
Calculate Linux features rolling release model of binary updates, however, it remains compatible with Gentoo source packages through Portage. It features a custom graphical installer allowing the user to configure many options during the install including the preference of Pulse Audio or Advanced Linux Sound Architecture (ALSA) for sound. It can be installed on a USB flash drive or hard drive with ext4, ext3, ext2, ReiserFS, btrfs, XFS, jfs, NILFS2 or FAT32. The Interactive System Build allows changing the distribution and creating new ISO images.

Like its parent Gentoo, Calculate Linux does not use systemd and instead uses the OpenRC init system.

Calculate Linux includes a natively developed set of tools named Calculate Utilities, based on the Qt5 framework. These tools offer the option to configure and update the system as well and assemble custom LiveCD images.

Versions 
 Calculate Linux Desktop Cinnamon/KDE/LXQt/MATE/Xfce is a desktop based on Cinnamon, KDE, LXQt or Xfce intended as a client/workstation. Features quick installation, easy system updates and ability to store user accounts on the server.
 Calculate Directory Server can act as a domain controller and can configure Samba, Mail, XMPP, Proxy services using simple Unix-like commands supplied by the Calculate 3 utility package. 
 Calculate Linux Scratch is intended primarily for administrators and users, who want to have their own Linux distribution optimized for specific situations. With CLS, you can create a bootable liveCD or USB-Flash installation media with any set of software you need.
 Calculate Scratch Server, a minimal server with only the Linux Kernel and Calculate Utilities.
 Calculate Linux Container, is created specially to be installed in a LXC/LXD container.

Version history

Reception 
In 2017, Robert Rijkhoff reviewed Calculate Linux 17.6 for DistroWatch Weekly:

See also 

 Artix Linux
 Sabayon Linux

References

External links 

 
 

2007 software
Gentoo Linux derivatives
Linux distributions
Linux distributions without systemd
Live USB
Operating system distributions bootable from read-only media
Rolling Release Linux distributions
Russian-language Linux distributions
Source-based Linux distributions
X86-64 Linux distributions